Estonian Boxing Association (abbreviation EBA) is one of the sport governing bodies in Estonia which deals with boxing.

EBA is a legal successor of EKRAVE Union which was established in 1920. EBA is a member of International Boxing Association (IBA).

References

External links
 

Sports governing bodies in Estonia
National members of the European Boxing Confederation
Boxing in Estonia
Sports organizations established in 1920